Atlanta Motor Speedway (formerly known Atlanta International Raceway from 1960 to 1990) is a  entertainment facility in Hampton, Georgia, United States, 20 miles (32 km) south of Atlanta. It has annually hosted NASCAR Cup Series stock car races since its inauguration in 1960.

The venue was bought by Speedway Motorsports in 1990. In 1994, 46 condominiums were built over the northeastern side of the track. In 1997, to standardize the track with Speedway Motorsports' other two intermediate ovals, the entire track was almost completely rebuilt. The project made the track one of the fastest on the NASCAR circuit. As a result, superspeedway rules are used at the track, despite being significantly shorter than Daytona or Talladega. It is now the most steeply banked mile and a half track in America. Despite the reprofiling being criticized by drivers, construction began in August 2021 and wrapped up in December 2021. The track has seating capacity of 71,000 to 125,000 people depending on the tracks configuration.

Racing 

The track hosted a NASCAR Cup Series race weekend annually on Labor Day weekend from 2009 to 2014. The 2009 move from an October race date to Labor Day weekend was also accompanied by a change in start time, marking the first NASCAR Cup Series under the lights at Atlanta Motor Speedway and the return of Labor Day weekend NASCAR racing to the Southern United States.

Other highlights of the facility are a  track between the pit road and the main track for Legends racing and a  FIA-approved road course. In 1996, the speedway hosted the Countryfest concert, attracting over 200,000 fans.

In 2004 and 2005, the similarly designed Texas Motor Speedway saw slightly faster qualifying times, and as the tracks' respective racing surfaces have worn, qualifying speeds at Texas have become consistently faster than at Atlanta. Prior to the 2021 reconfiguration project, NASCAR did not require restrictor plates at Atlanta, which helped lead to the adoption of Atlanta's commercial slogan, "Real Racing. Real Fast."  

On August 5, 2010, speedway president Ed Clark announced that Atlanta would be scaling back its NASCAR event schedule for 2011. The track kept its Labor Day weekend dates but lost its spring race. The race was given to Kentucky Speedway, another track owned by SMI, giving that track its long-awaited and desired Cup race, the Quaker State 400.

Every year from spring until fall, the speedway hosts "Friday Night Drags" where participants drag race down the pit road. The racing is conducted on an 1/8-mile stretch.

The facility also hosts several driving schools year-round, such as Richard Petty Driving Experience, where visitors have the opportunity to experience the speedway from a unique point-of-view behind the wheel of a race car. The track also hosts Speed Tech Driving School, which allows individuals to race 6 or more laps on the track when it is not in use for NASCAR or other events.

NASCAR president Mike Helton was once the track's general manager. Ed Clark is the current President and CEO of the track.

In late 2015 Atlanta Motor Speedway announced that they would install SAFER barrier around the whole of the outside and large portions of the inside around the track.

2021 marked a return to two NASCAR Cup Series weekends after Kentucky Speedway's event was given back, but also because of the ongoing COVID-19 pandemic, the Speedway, in Henry County, has been able to host events traditionally held in Fulton County. In November 2020, the Atlanta Track Club announced that the Publix Atlanta Marathon would move from downtown Atlanta to the Speedway premises. The three races (5,0000 meter, 21,097.5 meter, and 42,195 meter) were based around access roads, with the marathon being a two-lap race, the half being a one-lap race, and the 5,000 meter race utilising the same perimeter roads and parking lots, starting behind the Jimmie Johnson Grandstand and winding around track premises. At the end of the first (half) or second (full) laps, the courses then proceeded to make a loop around the Turn 1/2 tunnel and infield campground roads before finishing with one (5,000 meter) or two (half and full) laps around the oval, finishing on pit lane facing the start-finish line.  Molly Seidel, who a year previously had qualified for the United States Olympic Marathon Team and in the Atlanta Track Club-organised Olympic Trials in downtown Atlanta, won the women's half marathon at the Speedway with the eighth-fastest half marathon time for an American, 1:08:29.   

Likewise, in December 2020, Feld Entertainment announced that the AMA Supercross Championship and Monster Jam would move from Mercedes-Benz Stadium to the Speedway premises for 2021 because of the pandemic. The event would be held in frontstretch quad-oval.  Another motorcycle racing event would be held at the Speedway due to pandemic restrictions. American Flat Track would move the Atlanta round from Dixie Speedway to the Speedway. This race would be known as the Atlanta Super TT.

It was announced on July 20, 2021 that the 2022 AMA Supercross Championship will stay at the Speedway instead of in Fulton County.

Weather

In March of 1993, the Atlanta Motor Speedway was getting ready to race the Motorcraft 500 on March 14, but had to be postponed after Mother Nature threw a monkey wrench and dumped snow causing both Superstorm 93 and the race to be held on March 20 with Morgan Shepherd winning the race.

In early September 2004, Atlanta Motor Speedway found another use: it became a shelter for evacuees from Florida fleeing Hurricane Frances. While there were no indoor facilities available, visitors waited out the extremely slow-moving storm parked in their recreational vehicles, after creeping along for hours in traffic on nearby Interstate 75. Atlanta Motor Speedway has also opened their campgrounds to evacuees of Hurricane Irma in 2017, Hurricane Florence and Hurricane Michael in 2018, Hurricane Dorian in 2019, and Hurricane Ian in 2022.

In 2005, the speedway received heavy damage on the evening of July 6, caused by an F2 tornado spawned from the remains of Hurricane Cindy. Roofs and facades were torn off buildings and the scoring pylon was toppled. In 2005 practices began to extend in to Friday night, and shortly afterwards both Cup races began featuring night qualifying. In 2006, the Bass Pro Shops 500 start time was adjusted to guarantee a night finish.

In popular culture
The opening scenes of the 1980 movie Smokey and the Bandit II were filmed at the track, as were scenes of the 1983 film Stroker Ace; a 40th anniversary stunt show to commemorate the 1977 filming of the original Smokey and the Bandit in nearby Jonesboro, Georgia, was held at AMS in 2017 and attended by Burt Reynolds. The track was featured in the 1982 Kenny Rogers movie Six Pack. Former U.S. President Jimmy Carter once worked as a ticket taker at the track, and attended several races there as Georgia governor and as U.S. president.

The track was used as a filming location for the 2017 heist comedy film Logan Lucky as a stand-in for Charlotte Motor Speedway for some scenes. The outside barriers were repainted yellow to resemble those of the Charlotte track.

America's Got Talent: Extreme—a spin-off of NBC's reality competition America's Got Talent focusing on daredevil acts—filmed its first season at the track from September 27 to October 20, 2021.

Races

Current races
NASCAR Cup Series
Ambetter Health 400
Quaker State 400
NASCAR Xfinity Series
RAPTOR King of Tough 250
Credit Karma Money 250
NASCAR Craftsman Truck Series
Fr8Auctions 208
INEX raceCeiver Legends Car Series/Bandoleros
Thursday Thunder
Winter Flurry Series
O'Reilly Auto Parts Friday Night Drags
AMA Supercross Championship
Monster Jam

Former races
AMA Superbike Championship (1993–1994)
American Flat Track
Atlanta Super TT (2021)
Atlanta Track Club
 Publix Atlanta Marathon, Half Marathon, and 5km (2021)
ASA (1983–1984, 2004)
ARCA Racing Series presented by Menards (1984–2003)
Championship Auto Racing Teams
Kraco Twin 125's (1979, 1981)
Rich's Atlanta Classic (1979)
Kraco Dixie 200 (1982–1983)
IMSA Toyota Grand Prix of Atlanta (1993)
INEX raceCeiver Legends Car Series/Bandoleros
INEX Legend Car Asphalt Nationals (2012)
INEX Bandolero Nationals (2009, 2014)
International Race of Champions (1978–1979, 2004–2006)
NASCAR Cup Series
The Winston (1986)
NASCAR Craftsman Truck Series
E-Z-GO 200 (2005–2008)
NASCAR Goody's Dash Series
Superspeedway (1976–1983)
Quarter Mile (2002 & 2003)
NASCAR Whelen Southern Modified Tour (2010)
NASCAR Grand American (1968)
NASCAR All American Challenge Series (1986)
Red Bull Global Rallycross Championship (2013)
Red Bull Global Rallycross Championship Lites (2013)
Southern Superstars Short Track Series (2010)
NTT IndyCar Series
zMax 500 (1998–2001)
USAC Championship Car Series
Gould Twin Dixie (1965, 1966, 1978)
USAC Stock Car Series
Gould Twin Dixie (1978)
U.S. F2000 National Championship (1999)

Lap Records  
The fastest official race lap records at Atlanta Motor Speedway are listed as:

Track records

Classical oval (1.522 miles)

Quad oval (1.540 miles)

NASCAR Cup Series statistics
(As of 3/8/2022)

* from minimum 10 starts.

See also

 List of NASCAR race tracks

References

External links

Atlanta Motor Speedway page on NASCAR.com

Buildings and structures in Henry County, Georgia
Motorsport venues in Georgia (U.S. state)
Champ Car circuits
NASCAR tracks
ARCA Menards Series tracks
IndyCar Series tracks
International Race of Champions tracks
 
IMSA GT Championship circuits
Tourist attractions in Henry County, Georgia
1960 establishments in Georgia (U.S. state)
Sports venues completed in 1960